Khakiweed is a common name for several plants in the genus Alternanthera and may refer to:

Alternanthera caracasana, native to Central and South America
Alternanthera pungens